"Nothing Breaks Like a Heart" is a song by British musician Mark Ronson featuring American singer Miley Cyrus, released on 29 November 2018 by RCA Records as the lead single from Ronson's fifth studio album, Late Night Feelings (2019).

Peaking at number 2 on the UK Singles Chart and number 43 on the US Billboard Hot 100, the song was nominated for Song of the Year at the 2020 Brit Awards, marking Cyrus' first ever nomination.

Background and promotion
Ronson and Cyrus reportedly wrote the track in May 2018, posting on social media that they were working together in the studio. In June 2018, Ronson said that the song was "coming soon". While it had been rumoured beforehand, the song title was later confirmed on the BBC's website listing for The Graham Norton Show. The single was announced on 25 November 2018 via Ronson's social media. The following day, Cyrus announced the single, ending her four-month hiatus from social media.

Live performances
The track was first performed on The Graham Norton Show on 7 December 2018. Ronson and Cyrus also performed the track on Live Lounge on 13 December 2018 and Saturday Night Live on 15 December. On 28 January 2019, the duo performed on The Ellen DeGeneres Show. Cyrus joined Ronson to perform the song during his set at Radio 1's Big Weekend on 25 May 2019 and, in turn, he joined Cyrus during her set at the Glastonbury Festival on 30 June 2019.

Chart performance
In the United States, "Nothing Breaks Like a Heart" debuted at number 67 on the Billboard Hot 100, becoming Cyrus' 46th and Ronson's third entry on the chart, and later peaked at number 43. In the United Kingdom, the single debuted at number 10 on the UK Singles Chart, making it Cyrus' fourth and Ronson's sixth top 10 song on the chart. The song eventually peaked at number two in January 2019.

Music videos
Cyrus first teased the music video for "Nothing Breaks Like a Heart" on Twitter and Instagram on 26 November 2018. The video was filmed in October 2018 in Kyiv, Ukraine, with scenes taking place on the New Darnytskyi Bridge. It premiered on 29 November 2018. A vertical video of the song was released the following day, exclusively on Spotify. On 9 January 2019, the vertical video was uploaded on Cyrus' official YouTube channel.

Original video
The original music video was released through YouTube Premieres on 29 November 2018. The video begins with a news report of Cyrus driving to an unknown destination, and being followed by law enforcement officers on the New Darnytskyi Bridge. Throughout the video, a television news report titled "Miley's Wild Ride" can be seen. The song was not available on YouTube prior to the release of this video.

Track listings

Charts

Weekly charts

Year-end charts

Certifications

Release history

References

2018 singles
2018 songs
Disco songs
Mark Ronson songs
Miley Cyrus songs
Music videos shot in Ukraine
Number-one singles in Hungary
Number-one singles in Israel
RCA Records singles
Song recordings produced by Mark Ronson
Songs written by Ilsey Juber
Songs written by Mark Ronson
Songs written by Miley Cyrus
Songs written by Thomas Brenneck